Sonu Nigam (born 30 July 1973) is an Indian singer, music director, dubbing artist and actor. He has been described in the media as one of the most popular and successful playback singers of Hindi Cinema and Kannada Cinema. In 2022, he was honoured by the Government of India with Padma Shri, the country's fourth-highest civilian honour for his contribution in the field of arts.

Nigam sings predominantly in Hindi and Kannada language films but has also sung in Bengali, Marathi, Telugu, Tamil, Odia, Bhojpuri, Gujarati, Malayalam, Nepali, Tulu, Chhattisgarhi and other Indian languages. Nigam has released a number of non-film albums and acted in some Hindi films. He is known as the "Modern Rafi", a title given to him after his musical idol Mohammad Rafi.

Life and background 

Sonu Nigam was born on 30 July 1973 to Agam Kumar Nigam and Shobha Nigam in the city of Faridabad, Haryana. His father was from Agra and his mother was from Garhwal. His sister Teesha Nigam is also a professional singer. He also has another sister.

Nigam began singing at the age of four, when he joined his father Agam Kumar Nigam on stage to sing Mohammed Rafi's song "Kya Hua Tera Wada". Nigam began accompanying his father on his singing appearances at weddings and parties. He moved to Mumbai with his father to begin his Bollywood singing career at the age of 19. He was trained by Hindustani classical singer Ustad Ghulam Mustafa Khan.

Nigam identifies as Hindu. He married Madhurima Mishra on 15 February 2002. They have a son.

Nigam had changed his name to Sonu Niigaam citing numerology beliefs, but later decided to go back to his birth name.

Singing and composing work

He has recorded Romantic, Rock, Devotional, Ghazal and Patriotic songs. He has sung in Hindi, Odia, Bengali, English, Gujarati, Kannada, Maithili, bhojpuri, Malayalam, Manipuri, Marathi, Nepali, Tamil and Telugu till date. Nigam has released pop albums in Hindi, Kannada, Odia, Chhattisgarhi and Punjabi, as well as Hindu and Islamic devotional albums. He has released several Buddhist albums. Nigam has performed in countries in North America, Europe, the Middle East, Africa, Asia and Australia.

In May–June 2007, he participated in The Incredibles tour with Asha Bhosle, Kunal Ganjawala, and Kailash Kher. From September–October of the same year, he gave solo concerts titled Simply Sonu in Canada and Germany, becoming the first Indian singer to do so. In April 2008, he toured India promoting his Punjabi single "Punjabi Please".

1992–1999: Starting of his career 
Sonu Nigam started his career with the song Hum To Chhaila Ban Gaye (Episode No 9) From DD1's TV serial "Talash" (1992).

Sonu Nigam first Movie song "O Aasman Wale" from the movie "Aaja Meri Jaan" (1993). Nigam Also Sung The Song Title Song Of This Movie But It was Dubbed by SP Balasubramaniam .  He released his first album "Rafi Ki Yaadein " in 1992.

After this, he sung in the movies "Muqabla" (1993), "Veerta" (1993),"Meherban" (1993),  "Shabnam" (1993), "Kasam Teri Kasam" (1993),  "Aag" (1994), "Cheetah" (1994)  "Khuddar" (1994),  "Hulchul" (1994),   "Stuntman" (1994),   "Police Lockup" (1995), "Sauda" (1995),   "Ramjaane" (1995), Azmayish (1995) , Najayaz ( 1995) "Khiladiyon Ka Khiladi" (1996), "Papa Kahte Hain" (1996) ,"Gaddaar" (1995), "Dand Nayak" (1998), "Jaanwar" (1999), "Barsaat" (1995), "Aur Pyar Ho Gaya" (1997),  "Badal" (1999), "Dulhe Raja" (1998), "Jeet" (1996),  "Hero No. 1" (1997),  "Soldier" (1998),  "Devta" (1998),  "Keemat" (1998)",Himmatvar" (1996), Hindustan Ki Kasam (1999) "Shera" (1999),  "Sooryavansham" (1999), "Hogi pyar ki jeet" (1999) and many more.

He began hosting the hugely popular TV show, Sa Re Ga Ma in 1995. His song "Accha Sila Diya" for the film "Bewafa Sanam", gave him greater success. In 1997, he sang the patriotic song "Sandese Aate Hai" from the movie "Border" and performed the Nadeem-Shravan-composed song "Yeh Dil Deewana" in "Pardes" in the same year, both of which were highly successful.

Some of his notable songs were "Zindagi Maut na Ban Jaye" from Sarfarosh (1999), "Satrangi Re" from Dil Se, "Ishq Bina" from  Taal, "Mujhe Raat Din" from Sangharsh, "Ruki Ruki" from Mast, and his debut in Tamil "Vaarayo Thozhi" from Jeans .Sonu's album Deewana, with music directed by Sajid–Wajid, was released by T-Series in 1999.

2000-2010s: Career peak and multiple awards and nominations 
His popular songs during this period were "Suraj Hua Maddham" and"You are my Soniya" from Kabhi Khushi Kabhie Gham... and "Panchi Nadiya Pawan Ke" from the film Refugee, both of which he sang along with Alka Yagnik, "Tanhayee" from Dil Chahta Hai, "Tu Fiza Hai" from Fiza among others. He received his first Filmfare Award for the title song of the film Saathiya, which was composed by A.R. Rahman, with lyrics by Gulzar.  His biggest success during this period was the song "Kal Ho Naa Ho" from Kal Ho Naa Ho (2003), composed by Shankar-Ehsaan-Loy, with lyrics by Javed Akhtar. "Kal Ho Naa Ho" earned him the National Film Award for Best Male Playback Singer as well as the Filmfare Award.

2004 onwards, his popular songs include "Main Hoon Na" and "Tumse Milke Dil ka" from the film Main Hoon Na, "Do Pal" from Veer-Zaara, which he sang along with Lata Mangeshkar, "Chup Chup ke" from Bunty Aur Babli, "Pyar Ki Ek Kahani" and "Koi Tumsa Nahin" from the film Krrish, which he sang with Shreya Ghoshal, "Sun Zara" and "Chori Chori Chupke Se" from Salman Khan starrer Lucky: No Time for Love, "Dekho Na" and "Mere Haath Mein" from Fanaa both with Sunidhi Chauhan, "Inn Lamhon ke Daaman Mein" from Jodhaa Akbar, and "Main Agar Kahoon" from Om Shanti Om. In the film Parineeta, he sang four songs with Shreya Ghoshal. His most successful and acclaimed songs during this period were "Kabhi Alvida Naa Kehna", "Tumhi Dekho Naa" and "Kabhi Alvida Naa Kehna - Sad Version" from Kabhi Alvida Naa Kehna (2006), composed by Shankar-Ehsaan-Loy and lyrics by Javed Akhtar, all of which he sang alongside Alka Yagnik.

He was also the leading playback singer in 3 Idiots, rendering the songs "Jaane Nahin Denge Tujhe", "Zoobi Doobi" and "Aal Izz Well". In the film Kurbaan, he sang the song "Shukran Allah" along with Salim Merchant of the composer duo Salim-Sulaiman and Shreya Ghoshal, which was appreciated.

Nigam has released albums of Mohammed Rafi's songs including Rafi Ki Yaadein, a collection early in his career, which was re-released in Rafi's memory in September 2007 as a six-disc collection of 100 songs, titled Kal Aaj Aur Kal.

In 2008, soon after releasing Classically Mild, he released a single Punjabi track entitled "Punjabi Please" and Rafi Resurrected, a two-disc collection of Rafi songs with music by the Birmingham Symphony Orchestra. He contributed to the lyrics of several songs and directed the music for his album Chanda Ki Doli.

After the death of Michael Jackson, Nigam released a song as a tribute to Jackson which was included on the tribute album The Beat of Our Hearts.

In November 2007, at the inauguration of Harvard University's 28th president, Drew Gilpin Faust, Nigam sang Mahatma Gandhi's favourite bhajan, "Vaishnav Jan To Tene Kahiye", with the Harvard College Sangeet.

In July 2008, he participated in a three-city tour of the United Kingdom, singing Rafi songs with the City of Birmingham Symphony Orchestra (CBSO). This followed the release of these songs by the CBSO and the Indian music company Sa Re Ga Ma on Rafi Resurrected.

He participated in a US tour with Sunidhi Chauhan in 2009 called The Explosion 2009 tour and in a UK tour titled All Izz Well in November 2010. In 2011, Nigam collaborated with Kakas Entertainment and Laxmikant–Pyarelal for a Maestros Concert performing Mohammed Rafi songs.

2010–present: Continuing work in Bollywood and multiple concerts and several English Collaborations 
In 2010, Sonu sang  the popular song "Chori Kiya Re Jiya" from Dabangg as well as Tees Maar Khan title track which he sang in 54 voices. Sonu also sang "Aye Janani" song for Kandahar in which he hit the highest note in human vocal registry with an open-throat effort without singing falsetto.

Sonu was awarded Global Indian Music Academy Awards 2010 for his song 'All izz Well', BIG Star Entertainment Awards for Best Playback Singer of the Decade (2000–2010) (MALE) and Global Indian Music Award for Best Live Performer (Male) in 2010.

In 2011, Nigam collaborated with Britney Spears on a remix of her "I Wanna Go" track, and with DJ Avicii on his song "Indian Levels", produced by Avicii in 2012. In 2011, Sonu also collaborated with Michael Jackson's brother Jermaine Jackson on song "This Is It" which was written & composed by Sonu as tribute to Michael after his death.
 Sonu also performed song "Let's Go for Glory" at 2011 Cricket World Cup opening ceremony composed by Sonu himself.

Between 2012 and 2015 many of Sonu's songs were redubbed in other singer's voices by music companies because of his fight for singers' royalties and opposition to sign illegal contracts with companies.  Sonu said "I am not scared of being out of work because eventually good sense will prevail,".

In 2012, Sonu's song Abhi Mujh Mein Kahin	from Agneepath became a huge success. For this song Sonu won many awards including 5th Mirchi Music Awards for Male Vocalist of The Year", BIG Star Entertainment Awards 2012, 18th Lions Gold Awards, 2013 Zee Cine Awards, 19th Lions Gold Award, 2013 Times of India Film Awards and many more. He was also nominated for Best Male Playback Singer at Filmfare Awards. He considers Abhi Mujh Mein Kahin as one of his best songs.

He composed the title track of the film Singh Saab The Great in 2013 and has also composed music for other films including: Sooper Se Ooper and Jal, in collaboration with percussionist Bickram Ghosh in the same year.

He was ranked the Number 1 artist on the US Billboard Uncharted charts twice in September and October 2013.

He sang two songs for the movie PK, "Bhagwan Hai Kahan Re Tu" and "Love is a Waste of Time", which was a duet with Shreya Ghoshal. In 2014, Sonu also released a single called "Trini Ladki" in fusion with Chutney Music.

In 2015, "Sapna Jahan" from Brothers became popular. This was Sonu's 3rd collaboration with Ajay–Atul. "Tere Bin" from Wazir, which he sung with Shreya Ghoshal was also appreciated.

In September 2015, Nigam recorded a song with the music director Khayyam for the project titled Gulam Bandhu. Sonu also collaborated with musicians across the globe for Imagine (UNICEF: World Version) composed by John Lennon.

In 2016, Sonu released his single "Crazy Dil" featuring Rajkumar Hirani, Farah Khan, Sunil Grover, Kailash Kher, Natalie Di Luccio, Sonu himself with his son Nevaan. He then released another single "First Date" sung by Sonu & Jonita Gandhi.

He also collaborated with Transgender band "6 Pack Band" for song 'Sab Rab De Bande'. In Bollywood music, he sng 'Tu Hi Na Jaane' from Azhar and "Dard" from Sarabjit. Tu Hi Na Jaane' was Sonu's first collaboration with music composer Amaal Mallik.

In 2017 Sonu made an international collaboration, this time with Indian-American DJ kshmr on song 'Underwater'. His independent song with Shreya Ghoshal called 'Aye Jahaan Aasmaan' bagged him 9th Mirchi Music Awards for Indie Pop Song of the Year. The song was composed by Abhishek Ray. Cricketer Sachin Tendulkar collaborated with Sonu for his debut single "Sachin's Cricket Wali Beat"

'Hans Mat Pagli' & "Gori Tu Latth Maar" from Toilet: Ek Prem Katha were well-received as was "Maana Ke Hum Yaar Nahin" from Meri Pyaari Bindu. Sonu also sang one song in Shah Rukh Khan starrer Raees named "Halka Halka" but the song was not included in film because of creative reasons. Later the song was released on YouTube.

Sonu composed one song in movie Half Widow called "Kuch Baaqi Hai" which was also sung by him. He also sang one song "Aazaadiyan" with Rahat Fateh Ali Khan from Begum Jaan composed by Anu Malik.

In 2018, Sonu collaborated with American Rapper MC Yogi for song "Hall Of Fame". Sonu sang song "Aye Zindagi" composed by Vishal Mishra having five other versions of Asha Bhosle, Alka Yagnik, Suresh Wadkar, Abhijeet Bhattacharya and Shaan (singer). Sonu also teamed up with Meet Bros for dance number "Totta" feat. Sonu Nigam with Kainaat Arora.

In Bollywood, he sang a peppy number in Sanju called "Main Badhiya Tu Bhi Badhiya" which became very popular. He then sang a melodious song "Kulfi" from 102 Not Out in collaboration with Salim–Sulaiman. Sonu once again collaborated with Anu Malik for "Raat Kitni" and "Main Zinda Hoon" for movie Paltan.

He then sang the remake of "Badan Pe Sitare" originally sung by his idol Mohammad Rafi for Anil Kapoor starrer Fanney Khan. Sonu revealed that he was first hesitant to render the song because he didn't want to tamper with the original song but Kapoor  requested Sonu to sing the classic as he was playing an ardent follower of Mohammad Rafi in the film, which was why he wanted Sonu to give his voice.

Sonu also sang songs for social causes. Song "Tik Tik Plastic" was sung with social message of 'Say No To Plastic'. He also collaborated with Amruta Fadnavis for song "Mumbai River Anthem" to save Mumbai Rivers.

On 14 November 2021, Sonu travelled to United Kingdom for his tour "Rafi Kishore aur Main" presented by Grace Entertainment. He rendered his own songs,as well as evergreen tracks that were originally sung by legendary singers Kishore Kumar and Mohammad Rafi. A source who was present at the show shared, "The audience were glued to their seats for the four-hour long performances. Sonu curated the show with some of the most talented and sought after musicians from across India and also included some musicians who have been a part of the original compositions."

Sonu also launched his NFT Series which features his English-language single ‘Hall of fame’ and pages from his personal diary where he has penned down key moments of his life and details of his practice and recording session along with lyrics of his popular songs.  He became the first Indian singer to launch an NFT.

'I Believe Music' Label
Nigam has launched his own music label on 30 July 2020 named 'I Believe Music' and "Rudhrashtakam" is the first track to release under the label.

Work in Kannada

Nigam's first song in Kannada was in 1996 for the film Jeevanadhi. The song "Yello Yaro Hego" was composed by Koti with lyrics by R. N. Jayagopal. Nigam has since sung over 600 Kannada songs.

His songs include "Cheluve Yeke Bande", from the film Majnu, composed by Gurukiran; "Titanic Heroine Nee Nanna Cheluve", from the film Snehaloka; the title track from the film Monalisa composed by Valisha Sandeep; "Hamsave Hamsave" from the film Gatti Mela, composed by Hamsalekha,  "Kannale Kannale" from the film Aham Premasmi, composed by V. Ravichandran and "Baaninda Baa Chandira, from the movie Kanti, composed by Gurukiran. The 2006 film Mungaru Male created a sensation and spawned several records, mainly in Karnataka.

The songs "Mungaru Maleye" and "Anisuthide" were composed by Mano Murthy and written by Yogaraj Bhat and Jayant Kaikini respectively. Nigam has said that he finds Kannada songs more fulfilling than the Hindi numbers. In an interview with Deccan Herald he said "Kannada songs make me feel positive". He went on to say: "I highly respect the musicians of Karnataka and many of my favourite songs are in Kannada. I consider Bangalore as my second birthplace. Even if someone requests me to sing a Kannada song while I'm performing in the West Indies, I will sing it for them".

From the same Mungaru Male combination, composer Murthy, lyricist Kaikini and Nigam got together to record the Kannada album Neene Bari Neene, produced by Ashok Kheny. Videos for the songs "Neene Bari Neene" and "Baa Nodu Gelathi" were shot on the outskirts of Bangalore featuring Nigam and model Madhuri Bhattacharya in the lead. Nigam also composed a theme song for the Karnataka Bulldozers team in the Celebrity Cricket League and sang it with Kunal Ganjawala and Sowmya Raoh, who also penned the lyrics.

As a host and celebrity judge
Nigam was the host of the Sa Re Ga Ma music show from 1995 until 1999 and became household name. He returned on Sa Re Ga Ma Pa L'il Champs International as a judge with Suresh Wadkar in October 2007. Nigam was a celebrity judge on the Sa Re Ga Ma Pa Mega Challenge grand finale on 12 December 2009.

Nigam hosted the TV show Kisme Kitna Hai Dum on Star Plus in 2002. He appeared as the judge on Indian Idol in seasons 1 (October 2004 – March 2005) and 2 (November 2005 – April 2006), and was a celebrity judge in seasons 3 (17 August 2007) and 4 (16 January 2009 and 6 February 2009).

In 2006, Nigam hosted Life Ki Dhun with Sonu Nigaam on Radiocity 91.1 FM, interviewing musicians.

He appeared as a celebrity judge on STAR Voice of India in August 2007 (Season 1) and in December 2008 (Season 2), and on the grand finale of music reality show Jo Jeeta Wohi Super Star on 12 July 2008.

Nigam was a judge/mentor on Chhote Ustaad – Do Deshon Ki Ek Awaaz (July – October 2010) with Rahat Nusrat Fateh Ali Khan, and was a judge/mentor on the first season of X Factor (India) (29 May – 2 September 2011) along with Sanjay Leela Bhansali and Shreya Ghoshal.

On 23 August 2015, he appeared on "The Anupam Kher Show" sharing his life experiences. He has been also one of the three judges of Indian Idol 2016–17.

Sonu has also hosted 3rd Mirchi Music Awards, 6th Mirchi Music Awards, 8th Mirchi Music Awards, 9th Mirchi Music Awards, 10th Mirchi Music Awards, 11th Mirchi Music Awards, 13th Mirchi Music Awards and 14th Mirchi Music awards
In 2021, Sonu Nigam appeared as one of the judges in the Bengali music reality show Super Singer Season 3 on Star Jalsha, along with  Kumar Sanu and Kaushiki Chakraborty.

Singing style and influence 
Sonu is one of the most popular playback singers in Bollywood, and is widely considered to have inspired new singers in the Bollywood industry. He is often compared to Mohammad Rafi for similar voice texture. Lata Mangeshkar said, "Among contemporary signers, I like Sonu Nigam best. He is serious about his music, has learnt classical and sings with confidence.".
Singer Armaan Malik takes a lot of inspiration from him. Singer and musician Ankit Tiwari cites Sonu Nigam as one of his musical inspirations. Shreya Ghoshal considers Sonu her favourite contemporary singer. Palash Sen of Euphoria called Sonu Nigam the most talented singer in Bollywood. S.P. Balasubrahmanyam also appreciated his singing.

Awards and honours

Sonu Nigam is the winner of several awards including India's fourth highest civilian award Padma Shri, 1 National Award, 2 Filmfare Awards in Hindi & 2 Filmfare Awards South. He has received 17 nominations for Filmfare best playback singer, 10 nominations for Filmfare awards South and is a winner of record 4 times (9 nominations) for IIFA Award for Best Male playback singer and received Oscar Academy Awards nomination in 2014 for soundtrack of Jal composed by Sonu Nigam and Bickram Ghosh together. He was ranked the Number 1 artist on the US Billboard Uncharted charts twice in September and October 2013.

1997 - Sansui Viewers' Choice Award for Best Male Singer for the song Sandese Aate Hai, from Border
1998 - Zee Cine Award for Best Playback Singer – Male, for the song Sandese Aate Hai, from Border
1998 - 20th Aashirwad Awards for Sandese Aate Hai Border Best Duet Singers
1998 - Nominated: Filmfare Award for Best Male Playback Singer for Sandese Aate Hai from Border
1998 - Screen Award for Best Male Pop Artist for Kismat
1999 - Screen award for Best pop album for "Deewana"
2000 - Nominated: Filmfare Award for Best Male Playback Singer for "Ishq Bina" from Taal
2001 - Nominated: Filmfare Award for Best Male Playback Singer for Panchi Nadiya Pawan Ke from Refugee
2001 - Nominated: Filmfare Award for Best Male Playback Singer for "Tu Fiza Hai" from FizaFiza
2002 - Nominated: Filmfare Award for Best Male Playback Singer for "Suraj Hua Maddham" from Kabhi Khushi Kabhie Gham...
2002 - Zee Cine Award Best Playback Singer- Male, for the song "Suraj Hua Maddham", from Kabhi Khushi Kabhie Gham...
2002 - International Indian Film Academy Awards (IIFA) Best Male Playback Award, for the song "Suraj Hua Maddham", from Kabhi Khushi Kabhie Gham...
2002 - Screen Award Best Male Playback, for the song "Tanhayee", from Dil Chahta Hai
2002 - Bollywood Music Award for Best Pop Singer for the album Yaad
2003 - International Indian Film Academy Awards (IIFA) Best Male Playback Award, for the song "Saathiya", from Saathiya
2002 - Zee Cine Award for Best Playback Singer – Male, for the song "Suraj Hua Maddham", from Kabhi Khushi Kabhie Gham
2003 - Filmfare Award for Best Male Playback Singer, for the song "Saathiya", from the film Saathiya
2003 - MTV Immies for Best Singer – Male:  Saathiya title track
2003 - Zee Cine Award for Best Playback Singer – Male, for the song "Saathiya" from Saathiya
2004 - Filmfare Award for Best Male Playback Singer, for the song "Kal Ho Naa Ho", from Kal Ho Naa Ho
2004 - Producers Guild Film Award for Best Male Playback Singer for "Kal Ho Na Ho" from Kal Ho Naa Ho
2004 - National Film Award for Best Male Playback Singer: Kal Ho Naa Ho for "Kal Ho Naa Ho"
2004 - International Indian Film Academy Awards (IIFA) Best Male Playback Award, for the song "Kal Ho Naa Ho", from Kal Ho Naa Ho
2004 - Bollywood Music Award for Best Male Playback Singer for "Kal Ho Na Ho" from Kal Ho Naa Ho
2004 - Producers Guild Film Award for Best Male Playback Singer for "Kal Ho Na Ho" from Kal Ho Naa Ho
2003 - Most Stylish People in Music, MTV Style Awards
2004 - MTV Immies Award for Best Singer Male (Film) (Main Hoon Na)
2004 - Anandalok Best Male Playback Award for his songs in Bengali movie Bandhan
2004 - Apsara Awards Best Male Playback Singer (Kal Ho Naa Ho – Kal Ho Naa Ho)
2005 - Screen Award Best Male Playback, for the song "Main Hoon Na", from Main Hoon Na
2005 - Swaralaya Kairali Yesudas Award for his outstanding performance in Music.
2005 - MTV Immies Award for Best Pop Album Chanda Ki Doli
2005 - Indian Television Academy Awards Best Singer for Miilee
2005 - Lion Gold's Award for the song Main Hoon Na from the film Main Hoon Na
2005 - Nominated: Filmfare Award for Best Male Playback Singer for the song "Tumse Milke Dil ka" from the film Main Hoon Na
2005 - Nominated: Filmfare Award for Best Male Playback Singer for the song "Main Hoon Na" from the film Main Hoon Na
2005 - Nominated: Filmfare Award for Best Male Playback Singer for the song "Do Pal" from Veer-Zaara
2005 - Teachers' Achievement Award
2005 - Most Stylish People in Music, MTV Style Awards
2006 - Star Screen Award Best Male Playback, for the song "Dheere Jalna" from the film Paheli
2006 - Nominated: Filmfare Award for Best Male Playback Singer for the songs "Dheere Jalna" from Paheli and "Piyu Bole" from Parineeta
2006 - Annual Central European Bollywood Awards, Best Male Singer for Sau Dard Hai, from the film Jaaneman
2007 - Bollywood Music and Fashion Awards, Best Male Playback Singer for the song "Kabhi Alvida Naa Kehna" from Kabhi Alvida Naa Kehna
2007 - Nominated: Filmfare Award for Best Male Playback Singer for the song "Kabhi Alvida Naa Kehna" from Kabhi Alvida Naa Kehna
2007 - Nominated: International Indian Film Academy Awards (IIFA) Best Male Playback SInger for the song "Kabhi Alvida Naa Kehna" from Kabhi Alvida Naa Kehna
2007 - Nominated: Filmfare Awards South, Kannada for the song Anisuthide from Mungaru Male
2007 - Indian Television Academy Awards Best Singer for Dill Mill Gayye
2008 - Annual Central European Bollywood Awards, Best Male Playback Singer for "Main Agar Kahoon", Om Shanti Om
2008 - Nominated: Filmfare Award for Best Male Playback Singer for the song "Main Agar Kahoon", from Om Shanti Om
2008 - Filmfare Awards South, Kannada, Best Male Playback Singer for Ninnindale from Milana.
2008 - Indian Television Academy Awards Best Singer for Amber Dhara
2009 - Annual Central European Bollywood Awards, Best Male Singer for "Inn Lamhon ke Daaman Mein", from the film Jodhaa Akbar
2009 - Lions Gold Award for the song "Inn lamhon ke Daaman mein" from the film Jodhaa Akbar
2009 - Nominated:Filmfare Award for Best Male Playback Singer for the song 'Inn Lamhon ke Daaman mein' from the film Jodhaa Akbar
2009 - Filmfare Awards South, Kannada, Best Male Playback Singer for Yenagali from Mussanje Maathu.
2009 - Filmfare Awards South, Kannada,  Nominated for Best Male Playback Singer for the song "Mayavagide Manasu" from Haage Summane
2010 - Filmfare Awards South, Kannada,  Nominated for Best Male Playback Singer for the song "Hrudayave" from Krishnan Love Story
2010 - BIG Star Entertainment Awards Best Playback Singer of the Decade (2000–2010) (MALE)
2010 - Annual Central European Bollywood Awards Best Male Singer for "Shukran Allah", from the film Kurbaan
2010 - Nominated:Filmfare Award for Best Male Playback Singer along with Salim Merchant of the composer duo Salim-Sulaiman for the song "Shukran Allah" from the film Kurbaan
2010 - Global Indian Music Academy Awards (GIMA) for Best Live Performer (Male)
2010 - Global Indian Music Academy Awards (GIMA) for Most Popular Radio Song of the Year for "All Izz Well" from 3 Idiots
2012 - Filmfare Awards South, Kannada,  Nominated for Best Male Playback Singer for the songs "Paravasha Naadenu" from Paramathma and "Neerinalli Sanna Ale" from Hudugaru
 2012–2013 -  Filmfare Awards South – Nominated – Best Playback Singer Male for the song  "Chendutiya Pakkadali" from the movie Drama.
2013 -  Mirchi Music Award for Male Vocalist of The Year for the song Abhi Mujhme Kahin from the film Agneepath
2013 - Mirchi Music Award for Song of The Year for the song Abhi Mujhme Kahin from the film Agneepath
2013 - BIG Star Entertainment Awards for Best Playback Singer Male (Abhi Mujh Mai Kahin), Agneepath
2012 - Global Indian Music Academy Awards (GIMA) for "This is It" with Jermaine Jackson
2013 - Zee Cinema Award for Best Male Playback Singer for Abhi Mujhme Kahin from the film Agneepath.
2013 - 14th IIFA Awards Best Male Playback Singer	for "Abhi Mujh Mein Kahin" – Agneepath
2013 - MTV Video Music Awards India for Best Playback Singer Male | Abhi Mujh Mai Kahin
2013 - Nominated: Filmfare Award for Best Male Playback Singer for the song Abhi Mujh Mein Kahin from the film Agneepath
2013 - Times of India Film Awards Best Playback Singer Male | Abhi Mujh Mai Kahin Agneepath
2014 - Filmfare Awards South – Nominated – Best Playback Singer Male for the song "Baanalli Baadalago" from Simple Agi Ondh Love Story
 2014 - Mirchi Music Awards South – Best Male Vocalist Kannada
2015 - Bharat Ratna Ambedkar Award
2015 - Filmfare Awards South – Nominated – Best Playback Singer Male for the song  "Ringagide Nan Yede" from Fair & Lovely
2016 - Jagran Film Festival Award for Best Playback Singer Male Award for 'Dard' from Sarbjit
2016 - Global Indian Music Academy Awards (GIMA) Best Pop Song: “Saiyaan Bina” by Sonu Nigam and Bickram Ghosh 
2016 - Nominated: Global Indian Music Academy Awards (GIMA) GIMA Award for Best Duet with Shreya Ghoshal
2016 - Global Indian Music Academy Awards (GIMA) for Best Devotional Album 'Krishna Sudha Ras ‑ ISKCON 50th Anniversary'
2017 - 9th Mirchi Music Awards Indie Pop Song of the Year "Aye Jahaan Aasmaan" sung by Sonu Nigam and Shreya Ghoshal
2017 - Haryana Gaurav Samman by Haryana Government, Government of India
2018 - Doctorate from Teerthanker Mahaveer University, Moradabad in recognition of his outstanding contribution in the field of music.
2018 - Filmfare Awards South – Nominated – Best Playback Singer Male for the song "Roopasi Summane" from Mugulu Nage  
2018 - Lokmat Most Stylish Awards 2018
2018 - Iconic Achievers Awards 2018
2019 - 21st Century Icon Award for Magnificent Performing Arts Award
2020 - Bharat Ratna Dr.B R Ambedkar Award by Government of Maharashtra
2021 - Mirchi Music Award for Male Vocalist of the Decade for the song Abhi Mujh Mein Kahin (Agneepath)
2021 - 2021 Lokmat Sur-Jyotsna Award for his contribution to Indian music
2021 - Champions of Change (award) 2020
2022 - Padma Shri
2022 - Mirchi Music Awards for "Raag-Inspired Song of the Year" for the song "Bheeni Bheeni Si" from Mera Fauji Calling
2022 - Indian Television Academy Awards 2022 for The Performer of the Millenium

Discography

As a music director

Filmography

Dubbing work

Television

Controversies

His series of tweets branding 'Azaan' (Muslim call for prayer), temple, gurudwara, and other religious places using loudspeakers to disturb the people who don't follow the religion as "forced religiousness" landed him in a controversy as a member of a religious group (in particular against Azaan) took offence at the matter and the manner in which he voiced his concern. In his later tweet he stated that he stands by his statement. He later clarified that he is not against any specific religious ritual, but against the use of loudspeakers on religious buildings. He said that the use of loudspeaker to create noise pollution should be stopped beyond certain time as per the law of the land, irrespective of whether it is from a temple, mosque, gurudwara, or any other place. Later, Sonu again sparked controversy, when he posted a video of Azaan from his home which proved that he was indeed disturbed very early in the morning. Syed Sha Atef Ali Al Quaderi, vice-president of West Bengal United Minority Council announced a reward of ₹10 Lakh to anyone who shaved Nigam's head, to which Sonu Nigam responded by shaving his own head to claim the reward. He deactivated his Twitter account in 2017 citing lack of freedom of speech, and said that sensible discussions were not possible due to the polarised atmosphere.

In June 2020, after the demise of actor Sushant Singh Rajput, Sonu Nigam posted a video saying that the music industry is also monopolized by two major companies and that he had also faced similar discrimination. He urged these music companies to be fair and kind to the newcomers in the music industry. Although he stopped short of naming anyone he made it clear that the malpractices in Bollywood are terrible and are almost killing the music talent of the country. Sonu Nigam maintained that he didn't name anyone and was only putting up his point of view regarding the malpractices in the music industry of Bollywood. In his second video Nigam names Bhushan Kumar, CEO of T-Series and tells him to stay away from him.

In February 2022, he was accused of working with Rocky and Mr Rehan Siddiqui, who are blacklisted based on recommendations of the Consulate General of India for malpractices and supporting Pakistan-based terror groups. When Rajender Singh Pahl a show promoter from USA had contacted him for performing at a concert, he recommended him to contact Rehan Siddiqui.

See also 
 List of Indian playback singers

References

External links

 
 

Living people
Indian male playback singers
Bollywood playback singers
Assamese playback singers
Bengali playback singers
Kannada playback singers
Marathi playback singers
Nepali-language singers from India
Odia playback singers
Punjabi-language singers
Tamil playback singers
Telugu playback singers
Indian film score composers
Indian male pop singers
Indian television presenters
Male actors in Hindi cinema
Indian male child actors
Indian male voice actors
Performers of Hindu music
People from Faridabad
Sa Re Ga Ma Pa participants
Filmfare Awards winners
Filmfare Awards South winners
Screen Awards winners
Zee Cine Awards winners
1973 births
Singers from Haryana
Indian Hindus
Indian folk-pop singers
Pop rock singers
Best Male Playback Singer National Film Award winners
International Indian Film Academy Awards winners
Indian male film score composers
Actors from Mumbai